USA Lacrosse is the national governing body of men and women's lacrosse in the United States. It provides a leadership role in virtually every aspect of the game and has more than 450,000 members throughout the United States, and offers programs and services to inspire participation while protecting the integrity of the sport. The USA Lacrosse national headquarters is located in Sparks, Maryland along with the Lacrosse Museum and National Hall of Fame. In addition, the headquarters campus features the IWLCA Building, Tierney Field and a memorial to the members of the lacrosse community that died in the September 11, 2001 terrorist attacks. USA Lacrosse also oversees the U.S. National Teams, which have won a combined 30 world championships.

History 

USA Lacrosse was founded on January 1, 1998. It resulted from the merger of many different groups, including the Lacrosse Foundation, the United States Women's Lacrosse Association, the National Junior Lacrosse Association, the United States Lacrosse Officials Association, United States Lacrosse Coaches Association, United States Club Lacrosse Association, the US Lacrosse Intercollegiate Associates, the Central Atlantic Lacrosse League and National Intercollegiate Lacrosse Officials Association.

Structure and function 

USA Lacrosse policy is determined by a national board of directors. Nine board committees have a comprehensive responsibility for strategy, planning and design of initiatives with direct board access for support and approval. These committees are Executive, Board Development, Strategic Planning, Sport Development, Women's Game, Men's Game, Finance, Human Resources and the Regional Chapters active within each geographic region of the country.

While serving as the sport's national governing body, USA Lacrosse works in collaboration with both the National Collegiate Athletic Association (NCAA) and the National Federation of State High School Associations (NFHS) to oversee the game within the schools and colleges. NCAA and NFHS activity in lacrosse is almost exclusively focused on rules, with the additional NCAA focus on staging a postseason tournament. USA Lacrosse is essentially responsible for everything else related to the development of and service to the sport as its national governing body.

The NCAA governs college post-season play and writes rules for college post season competitive play for the sport, which have traditionally been adopted for regular season play by all men’s and women’s college lacrosse conferences and independents.

The NFHS is a body that provides support and coordination to each independent state high school athletic association. However, each state association operates independently of the NFHS and sets its own regulations and policies. The NFHS has committees that write/review rules for sports. The NFHS has an independent rules committee for boys’ lacrosse on which USA Lacrosse is represented. The NFHS also has an independent rules committee for girls’ lacrosse, but the NFHS has adopted US Lacrosse rules for girls and women’s lacrosse. USA Lacrosse also has formal representation on this committee. The NFHS rules committee for girls’ lacrosse provides feedback to the US Lacrosse Women’s Division Rules Committee annually.

USA Lacrosse also publishes US Lacrosse Magazine nine times per year, with a circulation to over 350,000 USA Lacrosse members. Its mission is to "connect the sports community, educate players, coaches and officials, entertain fans and keep the membership of USA Lacrosse informed." In addition to the print magazine, USA Lacrosse maintains LaxMagazine.com, which features daily national, regional and international lacrosse news, information, and scores, along with original features.

Membership
Fans, players, parents, coaches and officials can all be members of USA Lacrosse. USA Lacrosse members receive access to a variety of programs and services, discounts on books, videos, educational materials and U.S. National Team merchandise. Additionally, all members receive  USA Lacrosse Magazine, comprehensive lacrosse insurance, free admission to the Lacrosse Museum and National Hall of Fame and discounts on products and services while supporting the mission of the organization.

U.S. National Teams 

As the United States is a full member of World Lacrosse, it takes part in all competitions organized and sanctioned by it. USA Lacrosse oversees all aspects of the U.S. Men's and Women's National and Under-19 Team programs.

The U.S. Men's National Team has won 10 World Lacrosse Championships, and won six straight World Championships from 1982 to 2002. The last World Championships were held in Netanya, Israel in 2018 with the U.S. beating Canada in the gold medal game. In the Under-19 World Lacrosse Championships, the United States has won every tournament to date with a total of eight championships.

The U.S. Women's National Team has won nine Women's Lacrosse World Cups. The most recent World Cup was held in Towson, Maryland in July 2022, where the U.S. defeated Canada 11-8 in the championship. In the women's Under-19 World Lacrosse Championships, the United States has won world championships in 1999, 2003, 2007, 2011, and 2019.

Facility
USA Lacrosse moved to its current location in May 2016 and formally dedicated the new facility on Sept. 11, 2016. The facility is the result of a $15 million capital campaign entirely funded by private donors. Previously, the organization's headquarters were located in Baltimore adjacent to Homewood Field on the Johns Hopkins University campus.

The IWLCA Building at USA Lacrosse National Headquarters is the centerpiece of the campus. The three-level 45,000 square foot structure hosts office and meeting space for the US Lacrosse staff, the Crum Family Education and Training Center, and locker rooms. A new National Lacrosse Hall of Fame and Museum, features the Richie Moran Hall of Fame Gallery and displays highlighting the heritage of the sport and the evolution to the modern game.

The building overlooks William G. Tierney Field, which will be the training home for the U.S. National Teams Program. The intimate, lighted facility boasts a permanent seating area for 500 fans and berms surround the field that will allow for additional spectators.

In addition to serving as the training facility for Team USA, Tierney Field hosts numerous college, high school and youth games each year along with coaching, officiating and player education clinics.

Just above the seating area to Tierney Field is the Henry A. Rosenberg Jr. Promenade, which includes The Creator’s Game statue sculpted by Jud Hartmann that was moved from the old USA Lacrosse headquarters. The promenade also includes 21 pillars honoring college lacrosse programs from around the country.

Surrounding the south end of the field is the Chris Sailer Trail honoring 11 Intercollegiate Women’s Lacrosse Coaches Association Trailblazers: Pat Genovese, Tina Sloan Green, Caroline Haussermann, Kathy Heinze, Carole Kleinfelder, Gillian Rattray, Sue Stahl, Sue Tyler, Lanetta Ware, Marge Watson and Judy Wolstenholme.

Located off the trail is the 9/11 Memorial, honoring the nearly 70 individuals from the lacrosse community that died during the terrorist attacks on Sept. 11, 2001. Landscape architect Kris Snider, a former All-American player at the University of Virginia, designed the memorial.

Lacrosse Museum and National Hall of Fame
USA Lacrosse operates the Lacrosse Museum and National Hall of Fame at its headquarters in Sparks, Maryland. The new facility opened to the public in September 2016. Each year, members are inducted into the Hall of Fame for their contributions to the sport.

References

External links
 

Lacrosse governing bodies of the United States
Non-profit organizations based in Maryland
Organizations based in Baltimore
Sports in Baltimore
Sports organizations established in 1998
1998 establishments in the United States